Pablo Martín Miranda (born 14 December 1984) is an Argentine professional footballer who plays as a forward for Club Atlético Villa San Carlos.

Career
Miranda started his senior career at the age of seventeen, featuring for Villa San Carlos in the 2001–02 Primera D Metropolitana by making eleven appearances and scoring one goal; the club won promotion in that campaign. They did the same seven years later by going up to Primera B Metropolitana in 2008–09, Miranda had netted thirty-seven times in one hundred and sixty-seven fixtures in that period. After spending a year with Villa San Carlos in tier three, Miranda left in June 2010 to join Argentine Primera División side Godoy Cruz. He made his debut on 8 August in a tie at the Estadio Malvinas Argentinas versus Boca Juniors.

Having made twenty appearances in two seasons with Godoy Cruz, including in the 2011 Copa Libertadores against L.D.U. Quito and Independiente, Miranda was loaned out on 3 July 2012 to Primera B Nacional's Olimpo. He was selected four times, of which only one was a start, as Olimpo were eventually promoted to the Primera División. He returned to Primera B Nacional with Brown in 2013–14, eventually participating twenty-nine times as they were relegated. Miranda departed Godoy Cruz permanently in June 2014 after securing a return to Villa San Carlos of Primera B Metropolitana. Seven goals in nineteen games followed.

Miranda spent the 2015 campaign with Platense. He scored on his club debut, netting the opening goal of a home loss to Almirante Brown; that was the first of eleven goals for Miranda in 2015. He rejoined Villa San Carlos for a third time in January 2016, subsequently remaining for both 2016 and 2016–17. On 21 July 2017, Miranda joined Defensores de Belgrano in Primera B Nacional. His first appearance came in September versus ex-club Platense. Torneo Federal A's Sportivo Desamparados signed Miranda in January 2019.

Career statistics
.

Honours
Villa San Carlos
Primera D Metropolitana: 2001–02
Primera C Metropolitana: 2008–09

References

External links

1984 births
Living people
Sportspeople from Buenos Aires Province
Argentine footballers
Association football forwards
Primera D Metropolitana players
Primera C Metropolitana players
Primera B Metropolitana players
Argentine Primera División players
Primera Nacional players
Torneo Federal A players
Club Atlético Villa San Carlos footballers
Godoy Cruz Antonio Tomba footballers
Olimpo footballers
Club Atlético Brown footballers
Club Atlético Platense footballers
Defensores de Belgrano footballers
Sportivo Desamparados footballers